Harry Smith (August 15, 1889 in Union, Nebraska – July 26, 1964 in Dunbar, Nebraska) was a baseball player with the Chicago White Sox who played one game in 1912.  He was the starting pitcher, he pitched five innings for an ERA of 1.80 and is credited with a win.  However, he never played in the Majors again, though he did spend the next two seasons in the Western League with the Lincoln, Nebraska minor league team.

Sources
 Harry Smith recalled on Nebeaska Minor League Baseball Fremont Pathfinders
 Harry Smith sources at www.baseballibrary.com

Major League Baseball pitchers
1889 births
1964 deaths
Baseball players from Nebraska
People from Cass County, Nebraska
Chicago White Sox players
Fremont Pathfinders players
Lincoln Railsplitters players
Lincoln Tigers players